Macrothorictus is a genus of beetles in the family Dermestidae, containing the following species:

 Macrothorictus braunsi Andreae, 1967
 Macrothorictus kalaharicus Andreae, 1967
 Macrothorictus kochi Andreae, 1967
 Macrothorictus longitarsis Andreae, 1967
 Macrothorictus majusculus (Péringuey, 1886)
 Macrothorictus salinus Andreae, 1967

References

Dermestidae genera